is a public elementary school in , Chuo, Tokyo. It is operated by the Chuo City Board of Education (中央区教育委員会).

History
It was formed on April 1, 1993 (Heisei 5) by the merger of Kyoka Elementary School (中央区立京華小学校) and Teppozu Elementary School (中央区立鉄砲洲小学校). The school board had the new school use the Teppozu building, although the Kyoka building was used temporarily until August 31 of that year. Classes at the ex-Teppozu building started on September 1.

In 2009 the school had 112 students. By 2010 there were plans to raze the original building to build a new school building. Hideo Takahashi, an alumnus of Teppozu, campaigned against the building's destruction on historical grounds, and his son Yoshiaki argued against the destruction due to historical reasons and the price tag of the new school building.

The school held a farewell celebration of the former building on July 17, 2010. Classes were temporarily held at Meisho Elementary School (明正小学校) from September 1, 2010 to September 3, 2012, the day the new school building opened. The current school building was to have a playground on the last floor, and a retractable roof over it. The building houses elementary and kindergarten classes.

See also

 Elementary schools in Japan
 List of elementary schools in Tokyo

References

Further reading
  Profile at CiNii
  Profile at CiNii
  Profile at CiNii

 Books by the school district
  Profile at CiNii

External links
 Chuo Elementary School 

Educational institutions established in 1993
1993 establishments in Japan
Buildings and structures in Chūō, Tokyo
Schools in Tokyo
Elementary schools in Japan